The 2008 UCI ProTour is the fourth year of the UCI ProTour system. Following protracted disagreement between the organisers of the Grand Tours (ASO, RCS and Unipublic) and the UCI, all races organized by ASO, RCS and Unipublic were withdrawn from the ProTour calendar. This removed all three Grand Tours (Giro d'Italia, Tour de France and Vuelta a España), four of the five monuments (Milan–San Remo, Paris–Roubaix, Liège–Bastogne–Liège and Giro di Lombardia) and four further races (Paris–Nice, Tirreno–Adriatico, La Flèche Wallonne and Paris–Tours). As such, the quality of the races of the ProTour was diminished. The Australian race, the Tour Down Under was added to the calendar, making it the first race outside Europe on the ProTour (although races had previously been held outside Europe as part of the UCI Road World Cup).

The highly successful  ceased operations at the end of the 2007 season. Johan Bruyneel signed on to become the directeur sportif and revamp the embattled ; joining him are 2007 Tour de France champion Alberto Contador and 2007 Tour of California champion Levi Leipheimer.

2008 UCI ProTour races
As of September 28, 2008.

Teams
As of 6 December 6, 2007

Unibet.com Cycling Team, whose sponsors have pulled out of cycling, failed to submit its application renewal by the November 20, 2007 deadline.

Individual standings

 107 riders have scored at least one point on the 2008 UCI ProTour.

Team standings

Nation standings

 Riders from 23 nations have scored at least one point on the 2008 UCI ProTour.

2008 ProTour Points System

 If a rider is not part of UCI ProTour, no points are given. The points corresponding to the place are not awarded
 Top 20 teams get points in scale 20-19-18...1.
 Team time trials in stage races doesn't give points for riders.
 In Eindhoven time trial rider has to finish to earn points.
 In country ranking, top 5 riders of each country count towards the ranking.

References

External links
 

 
 ProTour
2008